Battersea Shield is a 2004 EP by The Orb and Meat Beat Manifesto.  It was sold in an embossed tin based on the design of the Battersea Shield, instead of a standard jewel case.

A different version of "Matron" was previously released as "Horn of Jericho" on the Meat Beat Manifesto album RUOK?. "Insane" was recorded and mixed at Concrete Hull in 2004.  "1855 BC" reuses samples which were used in previous Meat Beat Manifesto tracks.

Track listing
"Matron" - 7:12
"1855 BC" - 18:55
The Orb: "Insane" - 6:14

References

External links

The Orb albums
2004 EPs
Meat Beat Manifesto albums